Synchiropus moyeri, the Moyer's dragonet, is a species of fish in the family Callionymidae, the dragonets. It is found in the Western Pacific.

Etymology
The fish is named in honor of marine biologist Jack T. Moyer (1929-2004), who was director of the Tatsuo Tanaka Memorial Biological Station at Miyake-jima, Japan, for his “noteworthy contributions to the knowledge of the fishes of Miyake-jima, and in deep appreciation of the encouragement and logistic support he has provided to both of the authors”.

References

moyeri
Fish of the Pacific Ocean
Fish of East Asia
Taxa named by Martha Janet Zaiser Brownell
Taxa named by Ronald Fricke
Fish described in 1985